The Grand Synagogue of Paris, generally known as Synagogue de la Victoire  or Grande Synagogue de la Victoire, is situated at 44, Rue de la Victoire, in the 9th arrondissement. It also serves as the official seat of the chief rabbi of Paris.

History

The architect was Alfred-Philibert Aldrophe (1834–1895) who also built the Versailles Synagogue and that of Enghien-les-Bains.
Building commenced in 1867 and the Synagogue was inaugurated in 1874, and opened to the general public in 1875, built in the classical style, but embellished with Byzantine frills.

The inscription in Hebrew at the entrance is a verse from Genesis 28,17 : "This is none other than the House of God, the very gateway to Heaven", the same as is found on the entrance to the synagogue of Reims and that of Bar-le-Duc.

The interior has a number of religious inscriptions above the doors. In the choir pulpit is written in French the names of the prophets. Above the Torah Ark is engraved with the words "ה 'ניסי" ("The Lord-is-my-banner" Ex 17:15)

It also includes a series of 12 stained glass windows symbolising the Tribes of Israel.

The choir is separated from the assembly by a balustrade and the bimah.

Every year, the Sunday before Rosh Hashanah (Jewish New Year), there takes place a ceremony in remembrance of the Martyrs of the Deportation, which is televised on France 2.

Miscellaneous 

On April 21, 1890, Alfred Dreyfus married Lucie Hadamard in the synagogue. The ceremony was officiated by the Chief Rabbi of France, Zadoc Kahn, a future 'Dreyfusard' who advocated for Dreyfus' freedom.

In 1955, Meyer Jaïs (also written "Meir" Jaïs) became the first Sephardic chief rabbi of Paris and thus head of the Grand Synagogue.

The French organist Ernest Cahen played the Merklin organ of the synagogue.

In November 2013, French baritone David Serero performed a concert there.

Gallery

References

External links

Synagogues in Paris
Orthodox synagogues in France
Buildings and structures in the 9th arrondissement of Paris
Synagogues completed in 1874
1874 establishments in France